Federico Arturo Guízar Tolentino (8 April 1908 – 24 December 1999), known professionally as Tito Guízar, was a Mexican singer and actor. Along with Dolores del Río, Ramón Novarro and Lupe Vélez, as well as José Mojica, Guízar was among the few Mexicans who made history in the early years of Hollywood.

Career
In a career that spanned over seven decades, Guízar trained early as an opera singer and traveled to New York City in 1929 to record the songs of Agustín Lara.

In addition, Guízar performed both operatic and Mexican popular songs at Carnegie Hall, but he succeeded with his arrangements of popular Mexican and Spanish melodies such as Cielito Lindo, La Cucaracha (The Cockroach), Granada, and You Belong to My Heart (English version of Solamente una Vez). In 1936, his song "Allá en el Rancho Grande" ("There on the Big Ranch") launched the singing charro in Mexico after appearing in the film of the same name, succeeding as well in the United States.

Guízar made numerous television appearances, toured in most of Latin American countries, recorded a significant number of songs, and had his own radio show in Los Angeles, Tito Guízar y su Guitarra (Tito Guízar and his Guitar).

Films
He also appeared in dozens of films, including The Big Broadcast of 1938 (1938), Tropic Holiday (1938), St. Louis Blues (1939), The Llano Kid (1939), Brazil (1944), and The Gay Ranchero (1948), playing with such stars as Evelyn Keyes, Dorothy Lamour, Ray Milland, Ann Miller, Martha Raye, Roy Rogers, Mae West and Keenan Wynn. In the 1990s, he continued playing series parts in Mexican television.

Death
Guízar died from natural causes in San Antonio, Texas at the age of 91.

Partial filmography

 Under the Pampas Moon (1935) - Café Singer
 Allá en el Rancho Grande (There on the Big Ranch) (1936) - José Francisco Ruelas
 Amapola del camino (1937) - Antonio Rosales
 The Big Broadcast of 1938 (1938) - Specialty
 Tropic Holiday (1938) - Ramón
 Mis Dos Amores (My Two Loves) (1938) - Julio Bertolin
 El trovador de la radio (1938) - Mario del Valle
 St. Louis Blues (1939) - Rafael San Ramos
 Bachelor Father (1939) - Carlos del Rio
 The Llano Kid (1939) - Enrique Ibarra aka The Llano Kid
 El rancho del pinar (1939) - Alberto Galindo
 Allá en el Trópico (Back in the Tropics) (1940) - José Juan García
 De México llegó el amor (1940) - Tito
 Blondie Goes Latin (1941) - Manuel Rodríguez
 Beautiful Michoacán (1943) - Ernesto
 Amores de ayer (1944) - Tito
 Brazil (1944) - Miguel Soares
 Adiós, Mariquita linda (1944)
 Marina (1945) - Jorge
 'Como México no hay dos'! (1945)
 Mexicana (1945) - 'Pepe' Villarreal
 The Thrill of Brazil (1946) - Himself
 On the Old Spanish Trail (1947) - Rico - aka The Gypsy
 The Gay Ranchero (1948) - Nicci Lopez
 El Gallero (1948) - Gabriel
 En los Altos de Jalisco (In the Highlands of Jalisco) (1948) - Juan Chávez
 Ahí viene Vidal Tenorio (1949)
 De Tequila, su mezcal (1950) - Tito
 Sindicato de telemirones (1954) - Luis Manrique
 De ranchero a empresario (1954) - Tito
 El plagiario (1955)
 The Sin of Being a Woman (1955) - Javier Morales
 Los hijos de Rancho Grande (1956) - José Francisco
 Locura musical (1958) - Himself
 Music and Money (1958)
 Música en la noche (1958)
 The Time and the Touch (1962) - Max
 Allá en el rancho de las flores (1983)
 Reclusorio (1997) - Tito Iriarte (segment "Eutanasia o asesinato")
 La Usurpadora (1998) - Don Panchito

References

External links

 Tito Guizar singing with the actress Alma Rosa Aguirre in the film El Pecado de Ser Mujer (The Sin of Being a Woman) on archive.org 
Tito Guizar singing with orchestra on record albums archived on archive.org
Portrait of Tito Guízar and his family, wife Carmen and daughter Nina, Los Angeles, 1935. Los Angeles Times Photographic Archive (Collection 1429). UCLA Library Special Collections, Charles E. Young Research Library, University of California, Los Angeles.
 Tito Guizar recordings at the Discography of American Historical Recordings.

1908 births
1999 deaths
20th-century American male actors
20th-century Mexican male actors
Male actors from Guadalajara, Jalisco
American male film actors
Golden Age of Mexican cinema
Mexican emigrants to the United States
Mexican male film actors
Singers from Guadalajara, Jalisco
20th-century Mexican male singers